William Elmer Crouch (August 20, 1907 – December 26, 1980) was a Major League Baseball pitcher who played for the Brooklyn Dodgers (1939), Philadelphia Phillies (1941), and St. Louis Cardinals (1941 and 1945). The ,  right-hander was a native of Wilmington, Delaware.

Crouch was 4–0 with a 2.58 during his brief rookie season. He made his major league debut in relief on May 9, 1939, against the Cardinals at Ebbets Field. His first major league win came in his first start, a complete game 11–2 victory over the Phillies in the first game of a home doubleheader on September 8, 1939.

In 1941 Crouch finished in the National League top ten for games pitched (38), saves (7), and games finished (16).

Career totals for 50 games pitched include an 8–5 record, 12 starts, 4 complete games, 21 games finished, and 7 saves. Crouch allowed only 10 home runs and 60 earned runs in 155 innings pitched. His lifetime ERA stands at 3.47.  He handled 40 out of 41 total chances for a .976 fielding percentage.

Family
Crouch was the son of former major league pitcher William "Bill" Crouch. They are the only father/son duo from Delaware to have played in the big leagues.

See also
 List of second-generation Major League Baseball players

References

External links

1907 births
1980 deaths
Major League Baseball pitchers
Brooklyn Dodgers players
Philadelphia Phillies players
St. Louis Cardinals players
Scottdale Cardinals players
Monroe Twins players
Nashville Vols players
Montreal Royals players
Columbus Red Birds players
Eastern Michigan Eagles baseball coaches
Baseball players from Wilmington, Delaware
Eastern Michigan Eagles baseball players